The 1936–37 Western Kentucky State Teachers Hilltoppers men's basketball team represented Western Kentucky State Normal School and Teachers College (now known as Western Kentucky University) during the 1936-37 NCAA basketball season. The team was led by future Naismith Memorial Basketball Hall of Fame coach Edgar Diddle.  Several games scheduled for late January had to be postponed due to flooding along the Ohio River.  The Hilltoppers won the Kentucky Intercollegiate Athletic Conference and Southern Intercollegiate Athletic Association championships.  Ralph Dudgeon, William “Red” McCrocklin, Max Reed, and Harry Saddler were selected to the All-SIAA team.  Dudgeon, McCrocklin, and Saddler, also made the All-KIAC team.

Schedule

|-
!colspan=6| 1937 Kentucky Intercollegiate Athletic Conference Tournament

|-
!colspan=6| 1937 Southern Intercollegiate Athletic Association Tournament

References

Western Kentucky Hilltoppers basketball seasons
Western Kentucky State Teachers
Western Kentucky State Teachers
Western Kentucky State Teachers